In mathematics, a quartic equation is one which can be expressed as a quartic function equaling zero. The general form of a quartic equation is

where a ≠ 0.

The quartic is the highest order polynomial equation that can be solved by radicals in the general case (i.e., one in which the coefficients can take any value).

History
Lodovico Ferrari is attributed with the discovery of the solution to the quartic in 1540, but since this solution, like all algebraic solutions of the quartic, requires the solution of a cubic to be found, it couldn't be published immediately. The solution of the quartic was published together with that of the cubic by Ferrari's mentor Gerolamo Cardano in the book Ars Magna (1545).

The proof that this was the highest order general polynomial for which such solutions could be found was first given in the Abel–Ruffini theorem in 1824, proving that all attempts at solving the higher order polynomials would be futile.  The notes left by Évariste Galois before his death in a duel in 1832 later led to an elegant complete theory of the roots of polynomials, of which this theorem was one result.

Solving a quartic equation, special cases 

Consider a quartic equation expressed in the form :

There exists a general formula for finding the roots to quartic equations, provided the coefficient of the leading term is non-zero. However, since the general method is quite complex and susceptible to errors in execution, it is better to apply one of the special cases listed below if possible.

Degenerate case 
If the constant term a4 = 0, then one of the roots is x = 0, and the other roots can be found by dividing by x, and solving the resulting cubic equation,

Evident roots: 1 and −1 and − 

Call our quartic polynomial . Since 1 raised to any power is 1,
 
It can similarly be shown that if   = −1 is a root.

In either case the full quartic can then be divided by the factor  or  respectively yielding a new cubic polynomial, which can be solved to find the quartic's other roots.

If   and  then  is a root of the equation. The full quartic can then be factorized this way:
 

Biquadratic equations 
A quartic equation where a3 and a1 are equal to 0 takes the form

and thus is a biquadratic equation, which is easy to solve: let , so our equation turns to

which is a simple quadratic equation, whose solutions are easily found using the quadratic formula:

When we've solved it (i.e. found these two z values), we can extract x from them

If either of the z solutions were negative or complex numbers, then some of the x solutions are complex numbers.

Quasi-symmetric equations 

 

Steps:

 Divide by x 2.
 Use variable change z = x + m/x.

Multiple roots 

If the quartic has a double root, it can be found by taking the polynomial greatest common divisor with its derivative. Then they can be divided out and the resulting quadratic equation solved.

The general case 

To begin, the quartic must first be converted to a depressed quartic.

Converting to a depressed quartic 
Let

be the general quartic equation which it is desired to solve.

The first step, if  is not already zero, should be to eliminate the 3 term.

Then

Expanding the powers of the binomials produces

Collecting the same powers of u yields

Let

The resulting equation is

which is a depressed quartic equation.

If  then we have the special case of a biquadratic equation, which is easily solved, as explained above. Note that the general solution, given below, will not work for the special case  The equation must be solved as a biquadratic.

produces the values for  that solve the original quartic.

Solving a depressed quartic when  ≠ 0 
After converting to a depressed quartic equation

and excluding the special case  = 0, which is solved as a biquadratic, we assume from here on that 

We will separate the terms left and right as

and add in terms to both sides which make them both into perfect squares.

Let  be any solution of this cubic equation:
 
Then (since  ≠ 0)

so we may divide by it, giving

Then

Subtracting, we get the difference of two squares which is the product of the sum and difference of their roots

which can be solved by applying the quadratic formula to each of the two factors.
 
 
 or
 

The solutions of the cubic are:

using any one of the three possible cube roots.

Ferrari's solution 
Otherwise, the depressed quartic can be solved by means of a method discovered by Lodovico Ferrari. Once the depressed quartic has been obtained, the next step is to add the valid identity

to equation, yielding

The effect has been to fold up the u4 term into a perfect square: (u2 + α)2. The second term, αu2 did not disappear, but its sign has changed and it has been moved to the right side.

The next step is to insert a variable y into the perfect square on the left side of equation, and a corresponding 2y into the coefficient of u2 in the right side. To accomplish these insertions, the following valid formulas will be added to equation,

and

These two formulas, added together, produce

which added to equation produces

This is equivalent to

The objective now is to choose a value for y such that the right side of equation becomes a perfect square. This can be done by letting the discriminant of the quadratic function become zero. To explain this, first expand a perfect square so that it equals a quadratic function:

The quadratic function on the right side has three coefficients. It can be verified that squaring the second coefficient and then subtracting four times the product of the first and third coefficients yields zero:

Therefore to make the right side of equation into a perfect square, the following equation must be solved:

Multiply the binomial with the polynomial,

Divide both sides by −4, and move the −β2/4 to the right,

Divide both sides by 2,

This is a cubic equation in y. Solve for y using any method for solving such equations (e.g. conversion to a reduced cubic and application of Cardano's formula). Any of the three possible roots will do.

Folding the second perfect square 
With the value for y so selected, it is now known that the right side of equation is a perfect square of the form

(This is correct for both signs of square root, as long as the same sign is taken for both square roots. A ± is redundant, as it would be absorbed by another ± a few equations further down this page.)
so that it can be folded:

Note: If β ≠ 0 then α + 2y ≠ 0. If β = 0 then this would be a biquadratic equation, which we solved earlier.
Therefore equation becomes

Equation has a pair of folded perfect squares, one on each side of the equation. The two perfect squares balance each other.

If two squares are equal, then the sides of the two squares are also equal, as shown by:

Collecting like powers of u produces

Equation is a quadratic equation for u. Its solution is

Simplifying, one gets

This is the solution of the depressed quartic, therefore the solutions of the original quartic equation are

Summary of Ferrari's method 
Given the quartic equation

its solution can be found by means of the following calculations:

If  then

Otherwise, continue with

(either sign of the square root will do)

(there are 3 complex roots, any one of them will do)

The two ±s must have the same sign, the ±t is independent. To get all roots, compute x for ±s,±t = +,+ and for +,−; and for −,+ and for −,−. This formula handles repeated roots without problem.

Ferrari was the first to discover one of these labyrinthine solutions. The equation which he solved was

which was already in depressed form. It has a pair of solutions which can be found with the set of formulas shown above.

Ferrari's solution in the special case of real coefficients 

If the coefficients of the quartic equation are real then the nested depressed cubic equation also has real coefficients, thus it has at least one real root.

Furthermore the cubic function

where P and Q are given by  has the properties that
 and

which ensures that the two quadratic equations have real coefficients.

Obtaining alternative solutions the hard way 

It could happen that one only obtained one solution through the formulae above, because not all four sign patterns are tried for four solutions, and the solution obtained is complex. It may also be the case that one is only looking for a real solution. Let x1 denote the complex solution. If all the original coefficients A, B, C, D and E are real—which should be the case when one desires only real solutions – then there is another complex solution x2 which is the complex conjugate of x1. If the other two roots are denoted as x3 and x4 then the quartic equation can be expressed as

but this quartic equation is equivalent to the product of two quadratic equations:

and

Since

then

Let

so that equation becomes

Also let there be (unknown) variables w and v such that equation becomes

Multiplying equations and  produces

Comparing equation to the original quartic equation, it can be seen that

and

Therefore

Equation can be solved for x yielding

One of these two solutions should be the desired real solution.

Alternative methods

Quick and memorable solution from first principles 

Most textbook solutions of the quartic equation require a magic substitution that is almost impossible to memorize. Here is a way to approach it that makes it easy to understand.

The job is done if we can factor the quartic equation into a product of two quadratics.  Let

By equating coefficients, this results in the following set of simultaneous equations: 

If we set , then this equation turns into the cubic equation: 

which is solved elsewhere.  Once you have , then: 

The symmetries in this solution are easy to see.

Galois theory and factorization 

The symmetric group S4 on four elements has the Klein four-group as a normal subgroup. This suggests using a resolvent whose roots may be variously described as a discrete Fourier transform or a Hadamard matrix transform of the roots.
Suppose ri for i from 0 to 3 are roots of 
 
If we now set

then since the transformation is an involution, we may express the roots in terms of the four si in exactly the same way. Since we know the value s0 = −b/2, we really only need the values for s1, s2 and s3. These we may find by expanding the polynomial 

which if we make the simplifying assumption that b = 0, is equal to

This polynomial is of degree six, but only of degree three in z2, and so the corresponding equation is solvable. By trial we can determine which three roots are the correct ones, and hence find the solutions of the quartic.

We can remove any requirement for trial by using a root of the same resolvent polynomial for factoring; if w is any root of (3), and if

 
 

then

We therefore can solve the quartic by solving for w and then solving for the roots of the two factors using the quadratic formula.

Approximate methods 
The methods described above are, in principle, exact methods which find the roots once and for all. It is also possible to use methods which give successive approximations which hopefully improve with each iteration. Once such method is the Durand–Kerner method. Such methods may be the only ones available, other than special cases, when trying to solve quintic and higher equations.

See also
Linear equation
Quadratic equation
Cubic equation
Quintic equation
Polynomial
Newton's method

References
Ferrari's achievement

Notes

External links
Calculator for solving Quartics

Elementary algebra
Equations
Polynomials